Cindy Blackman Santana (born November 18, 1959), sometimes known as Cindy Blackman, is an American jazz and rock drummer. Blackman has recorded several jazz albums as a bandleader and has performed with Pharoah Sanders, Sonny Simmons, Ron Carter, Sam Rivers, Cassandra Wilson, Angela Bofill, Buckethead, Bill Laswell, Lenny Kravitz, Joe Henderson and Joss Stone.

Biography and early career 

Born November 18, 1959, in Yellow Springs, Ohio, her mother and grandmother were classical musicians and her uncle a vibist. When Cindy was a child, her mother took her to classical concerts.

Blackman's introduction to the drums happened at the age of seven in her hometown of Yellow Springs, Ohio. At a pool party at a friend's house she saw a drum set and began playing them. "Just looking at them struck something in my core, and it was completely right from the second I saw them", says Blackman. "And then, when I hit them, it was like, wow, that's me.". Soon after, Blackman began playing in the school band and persuaded her parents to get her toy drums.

When Blackman was 11, she moved to Bristol, Connecticut and studied at the Hartt School of Music in Hartford, Connecticut. Blackman began to have an interest in jazz at age 13 after listening to Max Roach and got her first professional drum set at 14.

Blackman moved to Boston to study at the Berklee College of Music with Alan Dawson, who had also taught Tony Williams—an inspiration for Blackman.  While she was at Berklee a friend recommended her for a gig with The Drifters so Blackman left college after three semesters and moved to New York City in 1982.

While in New York, Blackman worked as a performer but also attended shows to listen to masters play. Art Blakey became a significant influence. "He really was like a father to me. I learned a lot just watching him. I asked him a lot of questions about the drums and music – and he answered all of them.", said Blackman.

In 1984, Blackman was showcased on Ted Curson's "Jazz Stars of the Future" on WKCR-FM in New York. In 1987, Blackman's first compositions appeared on Wallace Roney's Verses album. In 1988 Blackman released Arcane on Muse Records, her debut as a bandleader. Her band included Wallace Roney on trumpet, Kenny Garrett on alto saxophone, Joe Henderson on tenor saxophone, Buster Williams and Clarence Seay on bass, and Larry Willis on piano.

Work with Lenny Kravitz 

In 1993, Blackman had an opportunity to work with Lenny Kravitz. From New York, Blackman talked over the phone with Kravitz in Los Angeles, and played drums for him as he listened. Kravitz immediately asked Blackman to fly out to LA. She stayed for two weeks including shooting the video for Are You Gonna Go My Way. She would go on to have an 18-year run as Kravitz's touring drummer.

Solo career 

In the late 1990s, Blackman made her first recording with a working group. They called the album Telepathy because of the tight communication in the band. Blackman and her band also recorded the instructional video Multiplicity.

In 2004, Blackman took a break from touring with Lenny Kravitz to focus on her own music. That year, she released Music for the New Millennium on her Sacred Sounds Label. "We experiment – but it's never free. Everything is written out. I have charts for all the songs. We expand on what's there, and stretch harmonics and note choices".

In September 2007, she made a tour of South America, teaching clinics in Argentina, Chile, and Brazil, and on November 30, 2007, Blackman and her quartet performed at Art After 5 at the Philadelphia Museum of Art.

In 2010, she released a first tribute album to her inspiration Tony Williams. Another Lifetime featured Mike Stern on guitar and organist Doug Carn following the line-up of the original Tony Williams Lifetime. As guest musicians appear Joe Lovano, Patrice Rushen and Vernon Reid. Reid is the lead guitarist on the second Williams tribute album Spectrum Road (2012), a collaboration between Blackman, Reid, John Medeski on organ and former bassist of Lifetime and Cream Jack Bruce. Bruce also sings on three tracks of the album and Blackman lend her voice to "Where", originally written by (then Lifetime guitarist) John McLaughlin and sung by Williams (Emergency!, 1969), which already appeared on Another Lifetime in an instrumental version. She appeared at the 2011 Montreux festival, Switzerland, playing drums for husband Carlos's one-off reunion with John McLaughlin, after which she helped mix the sound for the video.

In 2020, she released a 17 track album titled Give the Drummer Some. On this album, she sings on 11 of the tracks. The album includes performances by John McLaughlin, Matthew Garrison, Vernon Reid, Kirk Hammett, Bill Ortiz, and Neal Evans.

Personal life 

On July 9, 2010, Carlos Santana proposed to Blackman on stage during a concert at Tinley Park, Illinois. Blackman is Santana's touring drummer; he proposed immediately after her drum solo. They were married on Maui, Hawaii on December 19, 2010.

Blackman attended a Baptist church during her teenage years, but became a follower of the Baháʼí Faith at the age of 18; she also started studying Kabbalah in the 2000s. Blackman cultivates spirituality in her musicianship. "I believe that music is so sacred that once you're playing music you are doing the work of prayer, whether you're conscious of it or not, because you have a focused intent", says Blackman.

Blackman is a rarity as a female jazz percussionist. "In the past, there were a lot of stigmas attached to women playing certain instruments", Blackman says. "Any woman, or anyone facing race prejudice, weight prejudice, hair prejudice ... if you let somebody stop you because of their opinions, then the only thing you're doing is hurting yourself. I don't want to give somebody that power over me."

Discography

As leader
Arcane with Wallace Roney, Joe Henderson, Kenny Garrett, Larry Willis, Buster Williams, Clarence Seay (Muse, 1987)
Code Red with Steve Coleman, Wallace Roney, Kenny Barron, Lonnie Plaxico (Muse, 1990 [1992])
Telepathy with Antoine Roney, Jacky Terrasson, Clarence Seay (Muse, 1992 [1994])
The Oracle with Gary Bartz, Kenny Barron, Ron Carter (Muse, 1996)
In the Now with Ravi Coltrane, Jacky Terrasson, Ron Carter (HighNote, 1998)
Works on Canvas with J. D. Allen III (tenor sax), Carlton Holmes (keyboards), George Mitchell (bass) (HighNote, 1999)
A Lil' Somethin' Somethin' – The Best of the Muse Years (compilation, 32 Jazz, 2000)
Someday... with J. D. Allen III, Carlton Holmes, George Mitchell (HighNote, 2001)
Music for the New Millennium with J. D. Allen III, Carlton Holmes, George Mitchell (Sacred Sound, 2004)
Another Lifetime with Mike Stern and Doug Carn featuring guests Joe Lovano, Vernon Reid, Patrice Rushen, Benny Rietveld and David Santos (4 Q, 2010)
Give The Drummer Some  (Present Future LLC, 2020)

As co-leader or sidewoman
With Eddie Allen
Summer Days (Enja, 2000)

With Santi Debriano and David Fiuczynski
 Trio + Two featuring Greg Osby and Jerry Gonzalez (Free Lance, 1991)

With Melinda Doolittle
Coming Back to You (Hi Fi, 2009)

With Kali Z. Fasteau and William Parker
An Alternative Universe (Flying Note, 2011)

With Russell Gunn
 Love Requiem (HighNote, 1999)

With The Isley Brothers and Santana
Power of Peace (Sony Legacy, 2017)

With Rodney Kendrick
The Colors of Rhythm (Impulse!, 2014)

With Lenny Kravitz
 5 (Virgin, 1998)

With Greg Lewis
 Organ Monk (Greg Lewis Music, 2010)

With Carlos Martins
 Passagem (Enja, 1996)

With Wallace Roney
Intuition (Muse, 1988)
The Standard Bearer (Muse, 1989)
Obsession (Muse, 1990)

With Santana
Corazón (RCA, 2014)
Corazón: Live From México - Live It To Believe It (RCA, 2014)

With Carlos Santana and John McLaughlin
Live at Montreux 2011: Invitation to Illumination (DVD) (Eagle Rock, 2015)

With Saxemble
 Saxemble (Qwest, 1996)

With Sonny Simmons
 American Jungle (Qwest, 1997)

With Spectrum Road (Jack Bruce, Vernon Reid, John Medeski, Blackman Santana)
 Spectrum Road (Palmetto, 2012)

With Mike Stern
Big Neighborhood (Heads Up, 2009)

With Joss Stone
The Soul Sessions (S-Curve, 2003)
Mind Body & Soul (S-Curve, 2004)

With Alicyn Yaffee
Someone Else (Madman Junkyard / Little Green Butterfly, 2016)

With various artists
Black Night – Deep Purple Tribute According to New York with TM Stevens, Stevie Salas, Corey Glover, Richie Kotzen (Revolver, 1997)

References

External links 

 

American jazz drummers
American rock drummers
African-American drummers
American women drummers
American women jazz musicians
1959 births
Living people
People from Yellow Springs, Ohio
African-American Bahá'ís
Muse Records artists
University of Hartford Hartt School alumni
Former Baptists
Converts to the Bahá'i Faith from Protestantism
20th-century Bahá'ís
21st-century Bahá'ís
Berklee College of Music alumni
20th-century American drummers
20th-century American women musicians
20th-century American musicians
Jazz musicians from Ohio
Tak Matsumoto Group members
HighNote Records artists
African-American women musicians
20th-century African-American women
20th-century African-American people
20th-century African-American musicians
21st-century African-American people
21st-century African-American women